FC Haka is a Finnish football club based in the industry town of Valkeakoski. It is currently competing in Finland's premier division of football, Veikkausliiga. It is one of the most successful clubs in Finland, with nine Finnish championships and 12 Finnish Cup wins.

History
Haka has historically had close ties with the paper industry in the Valkeakoski area, and it is still sponsored by UPM Kymmene.

The club was founded as Valkeakosken Haka in 1934. In 1949 it was promoted to Finland's top division Mestaruussarja (now called Veikkausliiga), and in 1955 won the inaugural Finnish Cup.

The 1960s was the most successful era in the club's history, winning both the league and cup three times, including the first double in Finnish football history in 1960. The club was relegated in 1972, but came straight back, and won the double again in 1977.

The club's name was changed to FC Haka in the early 1990s. Haka won the title again 1995, but was relegated the next season. Keith Armstrong was hired as the new coach, and the club came straight back again, winning three straight championships from 1998 to 2000. Goalkeeping legend Olli Huttunen succeeded Armstrong as coach in 2002, and has already led the club to the championship (2004) and two cups (2002 and 2005).

Haka's best performance in UEFA competition was in the 1983–1984 season when they reached the quarterfinals of the Cup Winners' Cup, losing to eventual winners Juventus 0–2 on aggregate. The club has been involved in European competitions every year since 1998, the streak ending in 2008–2009 season.

In the recent years the club's financial situation has deteriorated on two occasions (like many other small market teams in Veikkausliiga). The first one was the 2008–09 season when a group of investors led by local businessman and restaurateur Sedu Koskinen (owner and founder of a nationwide night-club chain) formed FC Haka Oy to help an essentially bankrupt team to finish the season. In 2010 Sedu Koskinen left, after having put around 1 million euros of his own money into the club.

Since then the club's operations have been reformed to make it financial sound or at least not running on deficit. The team, having been one of the most successful and high stature in Finland, had been on run of deficit for several years during the 2000s. At the same time the overall economic situation in the world and also the sponsorship payments from UPM Kymmene diminished. This forced the club to rationalize its operations and adopt a new role as one of the smaller clubs in Finnish top flight football.  The current situation at the start of 2012 Finnish football season is described by the current chairman and board members as difficult but stable.

These times of financial struggles have seen the club move from a perennial championship challenger to a team usually poised for relegation. Both 2011 and 2012 the pre-season media predictions have placed the club in the bottom three. Haka finished last in the standings in 2012 and were relegated to the Finnish First Division. The club finally won promotion back to the Veikkausliiga for the 2020 season following a near perfect campaign in the 2019 Ykkönen, where the club only dropped 7 points and finished 19 points ahead of second-place TPS.

Honours
Mestaruussarja/Veikkausliiga
Champions (9): 1960, 1962, 1965, 1977, 1995, 1998, 1999, 2000, 2004

Finnish Cup
Winners (12): 1955, 1959, 1960, 1963, 1969, 1977, 1982, 1985, 1988, 1997, 2002, 2005

Finnish League Cup
Winners: 1995

Ykkönen
Champions: 1997, 2019
Promoted: 1973

European campaigns

Divisional movements

Top Level (60 seasons): 1945, 1950–72, 1974–96, 1998–2012, 2020–
Second Level (18 seasons): 1938–43/44, 1945/46–49, 1973, 1997, 2013–2019

Season to season

63 seasons in Veikkausliiga
18 seasons in Ykkönen
1 seasons in Kakkonen

Current squad

Management and boardroom

Management
As of 15 February 2021

Boardroom
As of 15 February 2021

Managers
 Jukka Vakkila (1982–84, 1986–87, 1993–96)
 Keith Armstrong (January 1998 – December 2001)
 Olli Huttunen (January 2002 – September 2009)
 Sami Ristilä (September 2009 – August 2012)
 Asko Jussila (August 2012 – September 2012)
 Harri Kampman (November 2012 – June 2013)
 Asko Jussila (June 2013 – July 2013)
 Juho Rantala (July 2013 – December 2014)
 Teemu Tainio (2018–present)

References

External links
Official website

 
Haka
Association football clubs established in 1934
1934 establishments in Finland
Valkeakoski